Qan can refer to:

Genghis Khan, a Mongolian conqueror
Qantas, an Australian airline
Qan, a foodstuff made of curdled pig blood

See also
Kan (disambiguation)
Quan, a family name